Pedakakani Halt railway station (station code:PDKN), is an F-category station in Guntur railway division of Indian Railways. It is situated on the Krishna Canal–Guntur section of South Central Railway zone. It serves Pedakakani of Andhra Pradesh.

History 
Between 1893 and 1896,  of the East Coast State Railway, between Vijayawada and Cuttack was opened for traffic. The southern part of the West Coast State Railway (from Waltair to Vijayawada) was taken over by Madras Railway in 1901.

See also 
 List of railway stations in India

References 

Railway stations in Guntur district
Railway stations in Guntur railway division